Difficult Run is a  tributary stream of the Potomac River in Northern Virginia in the United States. The area has had many historical uses dating back to the early 1800s. Today, the area is used recreationally by visitors interested in the watershed's variety of options including hiking, biking, fishing, boating, climbing, and bird watching. The wildlife at Difficult Run is vast as 163 different species can be seen depending on the season. There are 41 different soil types found on the trail and alongside the stream.  The stream is part of the greater 57.7- square-mile Drainage basin, or watershed, located in the north-central portion of Fairfax County and drains directly to the Potomac River.

Difficult Run flows through Fairfax County to Great Falls Park, on the Virginia side of the Potomac River.  The portion of the run through the park has been characterized as "a miniature Mather Gorge and Great Falls." The stream picks up speed as it narrows into a steep gorge with waterfalls and quickly reaches the same level as the Potomac. At the mouth of Difficult Run, one can see a panoramic view of the Potomac River.

Historical and cultural usage 
The Difficult Run is a tributary stream of the Potomac River that resides in Northern Virginia. The tributary stream is about 15.9 miles long. The stream is located in Fairfax County and drains right into the Potomac River. It is named not for the nature of the stream's rapids themselves; rather, long-boatmen in the time of the Patowmack Company found the two sharp bends of the Potomac near Difficult Run's mouth treacherous.

Historical usage

Mills

One of the Mills that is along the trail is Tolston's Mill. This mill was located on the east side of the trail. The Madeira School currently owns this specific mill now. Leigh Mill was once located on the west side of the trail and was once used to grind and produce corn in flour during the late 1800s. Colvin's Mill, which is currently a part of Colvin Run Mill Park used to be managed by Fairfax County Park Authority. Brown's Mill was located on a tributary of the trail. Brown's Mill was right across from Beulah Road.

Pikes and roads 
Old Georgetown Pike developed into a state highway in June 1974. The pike was a route followed by colonists and Indians where commerce was brought from Loudoun County and the Shenandoah Valley to Georgetown. Another road that went along the trail is the Old Leesburg Pike. This pike initially went through the Difficult Run on the northern side of the current bridge. General Braddock utilized the old highway during the French and Indian Wars where he marched his troops throughout the road on their way to Fort Duquesne. The old access to the bridge is still visible, but not currently in use.

Houses and taverns 
The Thomas Peacock house is still currently located on the eastern part of the Difficult Run. This land was once owned by George Washington. After Washington owned it the Sheppards bought it from him and built the house on this land in the early 19th century. The 18th Century Miller's house stands on the Difficult Run and was built by the miller of the mill on Hunter Mill Road. Wiley's Tavern is located on the south side of current Leesburg Pike.

Other sites 
There are various other sites along the trail, which include Drover's Rest, Old Quarry, Old Dominion Drive Bridge, Colvin Run Village, and Day Family Cemetery.

Modern usage 
Today the trail is used for hiking, biking, sightseeing, etc. The stream also is known for its various rapids that flow down it. The different rapids are all classified differently as one goes farther down the stream. The seven rapids that occur in the stream all have classifications that range from Class III to V. The Difficult Run is also famously known for its views of the Potomac and Mather Gorge cliffs.

Recreation
Recreational activities at Difficult Run include hiking, biking, climbing, boating, fishing, and sightseeing. The watershed itself encompasses a few parks and trails originating in Reston and reaching all the way to the Potomac River, at the end of the Difficult Run trail in Great Falls. Additionally, Difficult Run offers access to Great Falls National Park from certain areas of the trail, adding to the options for recreational activity.

Mountain biking 
Using community planning, a secluded 12-mile (19 km) hiking and biking trail was built along Difficult Run from Reston to Great Falls Park. The trail is well known among area mountain biking enthusiasts for its rolling terrain which makes for fast, smooth rides although there are portions requiring technical skills. The portion of the trail that sees the most mountain biking activity starts near the end of Michael Faraday Court, behind SkateQuest-Reston ice skating rink and follows the tributary stream valley to Lake Fairfax. From Lake Fairfax the trail crosses over Hunter Mill Road and follows Difficult Run itself all the way to Great Falls Park. Great Falls Park is a unit of the George Washington Memorial Parkway, and is administered by the National Park Service. In addition, almost the entire length of Difficult Run is paralleled by the Cross County Trail, which is maintained by the Fairfax County Park Authority for continuous coverage along the run.

Hiking 
The Difficult Run trail enters Great Falls Park and offers views of the Potomac River and Great Falls. The trail is 4.9 miles roundtrip and is estimated to take 2.5 hours. The various trails of Great Falls National Park (Ridge trail, Matildaville trail, Swamp trail, and Old Carriage Road) are also accessible from this hike. The trail is well marked with signs that point you to your desired location. Along the trail is the Cow Hoof Rock that is a popular spot for many of the parks rock climbers.

Fishing 
While fishing is allowed at Great Falls National Park and Difficult Run, a license is required for fishermen 16 years or older. This section of the Potomac River is known mainly for hosting Smallmouth Bass, Sunfish, and Catfish. It is encouraged that all mess is cleaned, as the park has a no trash policy and has no trash cans available on-site.

Boating 
This is the most popular of recreational activities at the Potomac River adjacent to Difficult Run. Whitewater boating (kayak/canoe) is commonly exercised as the rapids found in Great Falls Park are rated from class II (moderately easy) to class VI. Class VI rapids are considered extremely dangerous, as they are highest category of all rapid classes. A series of rapids starting at the Difficult Run Georgetown Pike entrance will lead to directly into the Potomac River. These rapids along the Difficult Run stream range from class III to class V. The Potomac River has many challenging currents, standing waves, and hydraulics. Swimming, wading, and tubing are not allowed in the river.

Climbing 

Climbing at Difficult Run can be done both with or without direction. The large number of rocks offer creative options for some park visitors. Others find direction by climbing routes set near the Potomac River. Routes vary from 25 to 75 feet in length. All climbing is top rope and no screws may be drilled into the rock. All climbing materials must be supplied by the park goer. Climbing routes are not available when the water level is high, specifically above a 4.5 on the Little Falls gauge. This reading can be found daily in the Washington Post's “River Stages” section.

The Cow Hoof Rock features 9 different climbing routes ranging from 5.8 to 5.12 in difficulty. The climbs include:

•F.I.S.T. (5.9-)

•Hemlock (5.10+)

•Hard Nut (A3)

•Socrates’ Downfall (5.8)

•Claws (5.12)

•Titania (5.10-)

•Ariel (5.9)

•Caliban (5.8)

•It's the Feet (5.10-)

Flora and fauna

Various species of birds, fish, and other animals live along the trail.  Muskrat and beaver can be found in the stream which runs adjoined to the trail which empties into the river known to provide habitation for various fish. 163 different species of birds are found here, these birds would include ducks, geese, and herons. Others would include songbirds, woodpeckers, vultures, and kingfishers.  As for snakes, copperheads are the only type of venomous snake found in the trail.

In the region where Difficult Run trail is found, birds such as the Scarlet Tanager and Kentucky Warbler inhabit the environment during the Spring months.  These birds migrate North to live for the Summer, which includes Fairfax County.  These are song birds brightly colored with plumage of gold, red, and blue.  The ground nesting birds appear in the Spring first, which would consist of the Kentucky warbler.  Nested in the trees are the Scarlet Tanager.  Other birds native to the trail during the Spring are the Prothonotary warbler and Swallows.

During the Spring, Skunk cabbage is the first to bloom in January.  Seasonal varieties also include Pink lady slippers, Fairy spuds, and Trout lilies.

Geography

Trail 
Located at 38.98 latitude and 77.25 longitude, the Difficult Run trail is located inside of Great Falls Park. Difficult Run lands in the Virginia side of the park. The trail is 0.7 miles one way making it a 1.4 mile round trip. The scenic trail starts near Georgetown Pike and ends where the difficult run stream meets the Potomac River. The trail is narrow and rocky in some sections and could cause problems to those with handicaps. The route consists of mostly non-paved trail systems with a few paved areas. Hikers, cyclists and horseback riders can make connections using Difficult Run to get to the Fairfax Cross Country Trail. This can be done on the Georgetown Pike end of the Difficult Run trail. Pets are allowed on the trail but must be on a leash at all times.

Drainage basin 

The stream is member to a 57.7- square-mile watershed located in the north-central portion of Fairfax County and drains directly to the Potomac River. Along its journey the stream travels over a series of rapids and through numerous rocky beds. There are 9 different streams and tributaries that work into or out of the Potomac river. They are Captain Hickory Run, Piney Run, Colvin Run, Snakeden Branch, Little Difficult Run, Rocky Run, Angelico Branch, Piney Branch, and Wolftrap Creek. The water is crossed by several major highways, including Leesburg Pike, I-66, Route 50, the Dulles Access Road, and by the W&OD Trail. The water runs off and forms four man made lakes. Lake Anne, Lake Fairfax, Lake Thoreau and Lake Audubon. Difficult Run flows through a wide variety of watershed conditions, from forest to urban areas. Just before it empties into the Potomac River, it flows through a narrow, cliff-lined valley. Difficult Run is the largest watershed in Fairfax County.

Soil 
There are 41 different soil types found on the trail and alongside the stream.  Two major soil groups make up the contents: The Glenelg-Elioak-Manor association and the Manor-Glenelg-Elioak association. The Glenelg soil type makes up 40.5 percent of the watershed area and is found throughout the watershed, primarily on hilltops and side slopes. Manor soils make up almost 11 percent of the watershed. Suspended sediment is a major problem in the Difficult Run area and water entering Chesapeake Bay. In 1993 Fairfax Relief and the Virginia Soil and water conservation district planted 1,109 native hardwoods as a part of a restoration project on a large flood plain for the main stem of the Difficult run stream. A lot of the soil found in this area is marine clay. This type of soil is found all around Fairfax County and is very problematic. This particular soil contains clays that swell up when wet and then shrink down when they dry. This can cause land slippage, slope instability, poor foundation support and poor drainage.  Another soil problem found in this area is naturally occurring asbestos fibers that have weathered off of greenstone bedrock. It is a very rare problem but asbestos can be potentially very hazardous if not detected. Soil conservation has rapidly been accelerating in the Difficult Run area for a very long time. This conservation can help stop landslides, corrosion, and contamination by metals

Crossings 
All locations are in Fairfax County, Virginia. Pedestrian-only bridges are marked in italics.

See also
List of Virginia rivers

References

Bibliography 
 Corbett, Roger. "Difficult Run - Old Georgetown Pike (Route 193) to Potomac R." American Whitewater. American Whitewater, n.d. Web. 08 Apr. 2016.
 "Difficult Run Hike." Hiking Upward. Virginia Parks and Forests, n.d. Web. 08 Apr. 2016.
 Sihler, Bob. "Cow Hoof Rock." : Climbing, Hiking & Mountaineering : SummitPost. Summitpost, 11 Nov. 2013. Web. 08 Apr. 2016.
 Sihler, Bob. "Difficult Run Trail." : Mountain Biking : MBPost. MBpost, 12 Nov. 2011. Web. 08 Apr. 2016.
 United States. National Park Service. "Hiking." National Park Service. U.S. Department of the Interior, n.d. Web. 08 Apr. 2016.
 United States. National Park Service. "Outdoor Activities." National Park Service. U.S. Department of the Interior, n.d. Web. 08 Apr. 2016.

External links 
 Fairfax County Parks Department

Rivers of Fairfax County, Virginia
Hiking trails in Virginia
Rivers of Virginia
Mountain biking venues in the United States
Protected areas of Fairfax County, Virginia
Tributaries of the Potomac River